Glycocaulis profundi is a Gram-negative, strictly aerobic and rod-shaped bacterium from the genus of Glycocaulis which has been isolated from seawater from a depth of 4000 meter from the Mariana Trench.

References 

Caulobacterales
Bacteria described in 2020